Stone Windmill can refer to:
 Stone Windmill (Morristown, New York), also known as McConnell's Windmill, listed as "Stone Windmill" in the U.S. National Register of Historic Places
 or it can be another term for windmills made of stone